Ronald Daniel may refer to:

Ron Daniel, management consultant
Ronald Daniel (police commissioner) of the Baltimore Police Department

See also
Ronald Daniels (disambiguation)